Anita Ghai (born 23 October 1958) is an Indian academic who was the former president of Indian Association of Women's Studies. She is currently a professor at School of Human Studies, Ambedkar University, Delhi since November 2015. She is also a disability rights activist in India working in the areas of sexuality, gender, health and education rights. She has authored three books.

Early life
Anita Ghai was born on 23 October 1958. She was diagnosed with Polio at the age of two. The polio vaccine came to India in 1959, one year after her birth. She has no memory of an "able-body". Ever since she was a child, external messages were given that being disabled is equivalent to being defective. As a child, she was made to visit temples, shamans, tantric priests and faith healers to find "cures" to her disability. She was unusually allowed to share a room with her male cousins, due to notions that desexualise disabled girls.

Academic work 
Ghai has been engaged with the field of disability studies for many years and her contribution to the field is considered seminal. Her volume, Disability in South Asia: Knowledge and Experience, is considered a significant step forward and a milestone; the first of its kind in South Asia. Ghai is pushing for disability studies to claim the status of a university discipline.

Ghai's book, Rethinking Disability in India, moves away from clinical, medical or therapeutic perspectives on disability, and explores disability in India as a social, cultural and political phenomenon, arguing that this 'difference' should be accepted as a part of social diversity.

Ghai is also on the editorial board of Disability and Society, and Scandinavian Journal of Disability.

Activism 
Ghai brings out the specific concerns and experiences of disabled women to talk about how disability has relevance to wider concerns. Through her work, she analyses disability, gender and brings thoughtful reflection on identity politics. Ghai who is the author of (Dis)embodied Form, writes about the gendered politics of disability and its impact on feminist theory. Her book (Dis)embodied form is the first of its kind to address the experiences of being a disabled Indian woman and shows us the ways in which these experiences challenge both disability and feminism in India.

She conducts workshops on sexuality and disability, as part of an online course run by feminist organisation, CREA. Ghai also advocates for sexuality education to be open and look beyond sex and sexuality within marriage.

Ghai was among the few feminists to write about how the PCPNDT Act is harmful to disabled children, since it allows abortion after testing for a foetal anomaly. She recognises how sometimes feminism and disability are at odds with each other through her writing and research.

Accessibility in India is a big issue that Ghai advocates for, including the daily challenges in the lives of people with disabilities due to the lack of ramps and inaccessible public transportation. She considers access as crucial for allowing people with disabilities to secure their proper citizenship rights. and has spoken out against the Indian government's token efforts for people with disabilities.

She has also advocated against the lack of accessible toilets, which restricts access to public places for many people with disabilities. She avoids drinking water when she is outside home, so that she doesn't need to use the toilet, and that it is common for women with disabilities to suffer from kidney stones because of situations like this.

In January 2016, Ghai was forced to crawl on the tarmac by Air India at Indira Gandhi Airport, New Delhi, as they failed to provide a wheelchair for her. This was in violation of the Director General of Civil Aviation guidelines. She described the incident as shocking and embarrassing. The airline denied Ghai's allegation.

Books 

 Disability in South Asia: Knowledge and Experience (Sage 2018)
 Rethinking Disability In India (Routledge 2015)
 (Dis) embodied form: Issues of disabled women (Har-Anand Publications 2003)

References 

Academic staff of Ambedkar University Delhi
21st-century Indian writers
1958 births
Living people